Isidor Bieri was a Swiss wrestler. He competed in the men's Greco-Roman featherweight at the 1928 Summer Olympics.

References

External links
 

Year of birth missing
Year of death missing
Swiss male sport wrestlers
Olympic wrestlers of Switzerland
Wrestlers at the 1928 Summer Olympics
Place of birth missing